The Square Capital Tower is a planned skyscraper, under going construction since 2005, with 70 floors in Kuwait City, Kuwait.

Overview
The complex is expected to contain offices in the 70-story tower, a five-star hotel in a mid-rise tower attached to its taller counterpart, and a spacious shopping mall. An underground garage will serve the project's parking needs.

The construction of the tower began in 2005. When completed, it will have a large unique twisting roof.

See also
 List of tallest buildings in Kuwait

References

External links
 
 John David Edison Interior Design - Official Website

Proposed buildings and structures in Kuwait
Buildings and structures in Kuwait City
Proposed skyscrapers